Leann L. Birch (born Leann Elsie Traub;  – ) was an American developmental psychologist, best known for her research on children's eating behaviors.

Early life and education 
Birch was born in Owosso, Michigan, and grew up primarily in Southern California. She obtained a bachelor's degree in psychology from California State University, Long Beach in 1971. She completed her graduate studies in psychology at the University of Michigan, earning a master's degree in 1973 and a PhD in 1975.

Career 
From 1972 to 1992, Birch was a faculty member at the University of Illinois at Urbana–Champaign, where she headed the Department of Human Development and Family Studies. In 1992, she became a professor and department head at Pennsylvania State University, where she remained for 21 years. At Penn State, she was the director of the Center for Childhood Obesity Research. In 2014, she joined the faculty at the Department of Foods and Nutrition at the University of Georgia.

Birch authored more than 250 publications that have been cited over 51,000 times. She served on a number of committees dedicated to obesity prevention, including a term as the chair of the Committee on Obesity Prevention Policies for Young Children at the Institute of Medicine from 2009 to 2011. Her research program is credited for its influence on policy and position statements from scientific and professional bodies, such as the Institute of Medicine, the American Academy of Pediatrics, and the Robert Wood Johnson Foundation Healthy Eating Research program.

Research 
Birch is credited with being a pioneer in the field of childhood eating behavior. She conducted research on a number of subtopics within this area, including selective eating, parental influences on eating behaviors, and psychological aspects of obesity, from infancy through adolescence.

One line of Birch's research examined children's food-related neophobia, the fear or dislike of novel items. She demonstrated that with repeated exposure, children can learn to like previously rejected foods, such as vegetables.

Birch co-led a project evaluating an intervention designed to teach first-time parents effective ways to respond to their infants' needs, aside from feeding. At three years old, children in the intervention group had lower BMIs, compared to children in a control group, and a smaller proportion who could be categorized as overweight or obese. This research was published in the Journal of the American Medical Association.

Personal life 
Birch was married to Karl Newell and had two children, Charlotte and Spencer. She died on May 26, 2019, in Durham, North Carolina, at the age of 72.

Honors and awards 

 2010: Bar-Or Award for Excellence in Pediatric Obesity Research from the Obesity Society
 2011: Fellow, American Society for Nutrition
 2012: E.V. McCollum Award, American Society for Nutrition
 2013: Pauline Schmitt Russell Distinguished Research Career Award, Penn State University

Selected works

See also 

Acquired taste
Psychological aspects of childhood obesity

References 

1946 births
2019 deaths
People from Owosso, Michigan
20th-century American psychologists
American women psychologists
American developmental psychologists
California State University, Long Beach alumni
University of Michigan alumni
University of Illinois Urbana-Champaign faculty
Pennsylvania State University faculty
University of Georgia faculty
Obesity researchers
American women academics
21st-century American women